Myanmar (also known as Burma) is divided into twenty-one administrative subdivisions, which include seven states (pyi ne), seven regions (taing detha gyi), five self-administered zones and one self-administered division (Wa Self-Administered Division). The regions were called divisions prior to August 2010.

Each State and Region has a State Hluttaw or Regional Hluttaw made up of elected civilian members and unelected representatives of the Armed Forces. The Constitution of Myanmar grants the Myanmar Armed Forces' Commander-in-Chief the right to appoint military officials to one-third of parliamentary seats, while the remaining two-thirds of seats are elected. The number of seats in each State or Region Hluttaw depends on the number of townships (each township constituency has 2 MPs), as well as ethnic representatives. The largest Hluttaws are the Shan State and Yangon Region Hluttaws, with 143 and 123 seats respectively, while the smallest are the Kayah State and Kayin State Hluttaws, which have 20 and 22 respectively.

The current Hlutttaws were elected in the Myanmar general election on 8 November 2015 and were first convened on 8 February 2016.

Second State and Regional Hluttaws (2016–21)

Leaders

First State and Regional Hluttaws (2011–16)

Leaders

See also
 Pyidaungsu Hluttaw
 Amyotha Hluttaw
 Pyithu Hluttaw
 Administrative divisions of Burma

References

Subdivisions of Myanmar